Das Nasobēm, usually translated into English as The Nasobame, is a short nonsense poem by German writer Christian Morgenstern (1871–1914).  It was written around 1895 and published in his book Galgenlieder (1905).

This poem is notable for, among other things, having inspired zoologist Gerolf Steiner to write in 1961 an extremely popular mock-scientific treatise on the fictitious animal order of the Rhinogradentia, also called "nasobames" or "snouters",  whose nasal appendages had evolved in many amazing ways.  Poetic translations of this poem (by Robert Weill - French, G.G. Simpson - English and L. Chadwick - English) can be found in his 1988 sequel .

References

Nonsense poetry
German poems
1895 poems